The 1999 Orange Prokom Open doubles was the singles event of the second edition of the first women's tennis tournament held in Poland. Květa Hrdličková and Helena Vildová were the defending champions, but Hrdličková did not compete this year. Vildová therefore competed with Eva Melicharová, and was defeated in the first round by third seeds Cătălina Cristea and Ruxandra Dragomir.

Second seeds Laura Montalvo and Paola Suárez won the tournament, defeating qualifiers Gala León García and María Sánchez Lorenzo in the final, 6–4, 6–3.

Seeds

Draw

Qualifying

Seeds

Qualifiers
  Gala León García /  María Sánchez Lorenzo

Qualifying draw

References
 ITF doubles results page

Doubles
Prokom Polish Open